Halle is a railway station in the town of Halle, Flemish Brabant, Belgium. The station opened on 18 May 1840 and is located on the HSL 1, 26, 94, and  96. The train services are operated by National Railway Company of Belgium (NMBS). On 15 February 2010, the Halle train collision occurred between the stations of Halle and Buizingen, killing 19 and injuring 171.

Train services
The station is served by the following services:

Intercity services (IC-06) Tournai - Ath - Halle - Brussels - Brussels Airport
Intercity services (IC-11) Binche - Braine-le-Comte - Halle - Brussels - Mechelen - Turnhout (weekdays)
Intercity services (IC-11) Binche - Braine-le-Comte - Halle - Brussels - Schaarbeek (weekends)
Intercity services (IC-14) Quiévrain - Mons - Braine-le-Comte - Halle - Brussels - Leuven - Liege (weekdays)
Intercity services (IC-26) Kortrijk - Tournai - Halle - Brussels - Dendermonde - Lokeren - Sint Niklaas (weekdays)
Brussels RER services (S2) Braine-le-Comte - Halle - Brussels - Leuven
Brussels RER services (S5) (Geraardsbergen -) Enghien - Halle - Etterbeek - Brussels-Luxembourg - Mechelen (weekdays)
Brussels RER services (S5)  Halle - Etterbeek - Brussels-Schuman - Mechelen (weekends)
Brussels RER services (S6) Aalst - Denderleeuw - Geraardsbergen - Halle - Brussels - Schaarbeek (weekdays)
Brussels RER services (S6) Denderleeuw - Geraardsbergen - Halle - Brussels - Schaarbeek (weekends)
Brussels RER services (S7) Halle - Merode - Vilvoorde (weekdays)

See also
 List of railway stations in Belgium

References

External links
 
 Halle railway station at Belgian Railways website

Railway stations in Belgium
Railway stations in Flemish Brabant
Railway stations in Belgium opened in 1840